Caparmena adlbaueri is a species of beetle in the family Cerambycidae, and the only species in the genus Caparmena. It was described by Sudre and Téocchi in 2002.

References

Morimopsini
Beetles described in 2002